Alonzo Smith "Jake" Gaither (April 11, 1903 – February 18, 1994) was an American football coach and college athletics administrator.  He served as the head  football coach at Florida A&M University (FAMU) for 25 years, from 1945 to 1969, compiling a record of 204–36–4. His won–loss record is among the best of any college football coach.

Gaither was born in 1903 in Dayton, Tennessee. His father was a preacher, and as a youth Gaither expected to also become a preacher. He graduated from Knoxville College, where he played football as an end in 1927. Gaither's father died around that time, and Gaither became a high school football coach to help support his family. Gaither later completed a master's degree at Ohio State University in 1937.

Gaither went to work as an assistant to head coach William M. Bell at Florida A&M College for Negroes (as it was called then) in 1937. The FAMC Rattlers had an undefeated (8–0) season that year, and won their first black college football national championship. The school won the national title again in 1942. Bell left to enter military service in 1943. After two years of problems in the football program, Gaither was hired as the head football coach for Florida A&M College in 1945. One story is that the president of the college could not find anyone else to take the job.

Gaither worked very hard to motivate his players. He would say, "I like my boys to be agile, mobile, and hostile." It is reported that he would hide an onion in his handkerchief to work up tears in his pre-game pep talks. He built up an effective recruiting network; in the days of Jim Crow, he had the pick of every good black high school player in Florida. Indeed, by the 1960s did not even bother to recruit players from outside the state. Gaither was dedicated to his job. After retiring, he told his biographer, "I run into so many people who have no deep sense of morals—people who got a price tag on them, who'd sell their soul. I want to find the man who has no price tag on him. I'm not for sale."

Gaither instituted an annual coaching clinic at FAMU in the late 1950s. He recruited major college coaches, including Paul "Bear" Bryant, Frank Broyles, Darrell Royal, Woody Hayes and Adolph Rupp, among others, to staff the clinics.

Gaither introduced the Split-T formation in 1963, and it was soon adopted at other colleges. In 1969 Florida A&M defeated the Spartans of the University of Tampa, 34–28, in the South's first football game between a white college and a historically black college.

Gaither also coached basketball and track in his early years as football coach. He later became Director of Athletics and Chairman of the Department of Health, Physical Education and Recreation at FAMU. He continued to hold the last two positions after he retired as coach until his retirement from teaching in 1973.

When Gaither retired from coaching in 1969, his Florida A&M teams had a 204–36–4 record, for a .844 winning percentage. Thirty-six players from Gaither's teams were All-Americans, and 42 went on to play in the National Football League (NFL). Gaither was named Southern Intercollegiate Athletic Conference Coach of the Decade. He was named College Division Coach of the Year by the American Football Coaches Association in 1962, and was voted into the College Football Hall of Fame in 1975. He also received the Amos Alonzo Stagg Award that year, and the Walter Camp Man of the Year award in 1974. The Jake Gaither Trophy has been awarded to the best Black collegiate football player each year since 1978. The Jake Gaither Gymnasium is located on the FAMU campus.

Gaither died in Tallahassee, Florida in 1994. The Jake Gaither House where he lived is now a cultural center.

Head coaching record

See also
 List of college football coaches with 200 wins

References

Additional sources

  - URL retrieved June 30, 2008
  - URL retrieved June 30, 2008
 The Alonzo S. "Jake" Gaither Award - URL retrieved June 25, 2006
  - URL retrieved June 30, 2008

External links
 

1903 births
1994 deaths
Florida A&M Rattlers and Lady Rattlers athletic directors
Florida A&M Rattlers football coaches
Knoxville Bulldogs football players
College Football Hall of Fame inductees
Ohio State University alumni
People from Dayton, Tennessee
African-American coaches of American football
African-American players of American football
African-American college athletic directors in the United States
20th-century African-American sportspeople